Monte Vidon may refer to two Italian municipalities in the Marche:

Monte Vidon Combatte, in the Province of Fermo
Monte Vidon Corrado, in the Province of Fermo